Encyclopædia Britannica Ultimate Reference Suite is an encyclopaedia based on the Encyclopædia Britannica and published by Encyclopædia Britannica, Inc. It was published between 2003 and 2015.

Product description
The DVD contains over 100,000 articles, an atlas, around 35,000 media files (images, video and audio) and a dictionary and thesaurus based on Merriam-Webster.

Awards
Encyclopædia Britannica Ultimate Reference Suite received the 2004 Distinguished Achievement Award from the Association of Educational Publishers. Its predecessor, Britannica DVD, received Codie awards in 2000, 2001 and 2002.

Linux support
There is no official release of Britannica for the Linux operating system; however, a script is provided that can help experienced users run Encyclopædia Britannica 2004 Ultimate Reference Suite DVD (and other 2004 editions of Britannica) on Linux, with some limitations (for example the dictionary, Flash/QuickTime presentations, and content update functions do not work, and preferences must be edited manually).  This script specifically requires version 1.3.1 of JRE, but can usually be made to work with newer versions if the version check is commented out.

Minimum system requirements
The 2012 edition states the following system requirements:

See also
 Encyclopædia Britannica
 Encyclopædia Britannica Online

References

External links
 

English-language encyclopedias
British encyclopedias
American encyclopedias
Editions of the Encyclopædia Britannica
Educational software for macOS
Educational software for Windows
21st-century encyclopedias
Multimedia